Results of India national football team from 1960–1969.

1960

1961

1962

1964

1965

1966

1967

1968

1969

See also
India national football team results (1947–1959)
India national football team results (1970–1979)
History of the India national football team

References

Football
1960